Microcotylinae is a subfamily within  family Microcotylidae and class Monogenea. This subfamily was created by Taschenberg in 1879.

Species
According to the World Register of Marine Species, there are 29 genera in this subfamily:

References

Microcotylidae
Protostome subfamilies